Cheng Changgeng (22 November 1811 – 24 January 1880) was a Qing dynasty Hui opera and Peking opera artist based in Beijing, who specialized in laosheng roles, or old gentlemen. Sometimes called the "Father of Peking Opera", he was the leader of the Three Celebrations Company as well as the leader of the actor's guild in Beijing. He was from Qianshan, Anhui.

His disciple Tan Xinpei was also a famous Peking opera performer.

In popular culture
Actor Ji Qilin starred as Cheng Changgeng in the 1994 TV series Big Boss Cheng Changgeng. Kunqu master Cong Zhaohuan portrayed Cheng Changgeng in the 1996 TV series The Incredible Injustice to an Opera Actor. Peking opera performer Li Haotian played Cheng Changgeng in the 2002 comedy TV series The Best Clown Under Heaven.

References

Chinese male Peking opera actors
Male actors from Anhui
Singers from Anhui
People from Qianshan, Anhui
19th-century Chinese male actors
19th-century Chinese male singers
1811 births
1880 deaths